Halloway is a surname. Notable people with the surname include:

Anis Halloway, Sierra Leonian singer-songwriter resident in London
Arthur Halloway (1885–1961), pioneering Australian rugby league footballer and coach
Bill Halloway (born: NSW, Australia), a rugby league footballer in the New South Wales Rugby League (NSWRL) competition
Ransom Halloway (born 1793), United States Representative from New York
William "Will" Halloway and Charles Halloway, surname of two fictional characters from the novel Something Wicked This Way Comes
Halloway (EP) by Tessa Violet, American singer-songwriter/online personality

See also
Holloway (disambiguation)